Drakelow Hillfort, is a small multivallate Iron Age hillfort, located on a promontory (known as Drakelow Hill) at Drakelow at the southern end of Kinver Edge, in the civil parish of Wolverley and Cookley, Worcestershire.  The hillfort is a scheduled monument.

Notes

References

Hill forts in Worcestershire